The flat-haired mouse (Mus platythrix) is a species of rodent in the family Muridae.
It is found only in India, where it is widely distributed throughout South India and central India.

References

Mus (rodent)
Rodents of India
Mammals described in 1832
Taxa named by Frederick Debell Bennett
Taxonomy articles created by Polbot